Ángel Luis Casero Moreno (born 27 September 1972 in Albalat dels Tarongers, Province of Valencia) is a retired Spanish road bicycle racer who raced professionally between 1994 and 2005.

His first win was at the 1995 Clásica a los Puertos de Guadarrama followed by the 1997 Vuelta a Castilla y León. In 1998 and 1999, he was Spanish national champion; in 1999, he finished fifth in the Tour de France.  He finished second in the Vuelta a España in 2000 and won it in 2001. His name was later tied to the Operation Puerto doping case.

Career achievements

Major results

1993
 8th Overall Tour de l'Avenir
1994
 1st  Overall Tour de l'Avenir
 3rd Overall Vuelta a Mallorca
 10th Overall Tour de Luxembourg
1995
 1st Clásica a los Puertos de Guadarrama
 2nd Time trial, National Road Championships
1996
 8th Overall Critérium International
1997
 1st  Overall Vuelta a Castilla y León
1st Stage 3 (ITT)
 2nd Overall Volta a Catalunya
1998
 National Road Championships
1st  Road race
3rd Time trial
 3rd Overall Vuelta a Burgos
 3rd Subida a Urkiola
 7th Clásica de San Sebastián
 8th Overall Volta a Catalunya
 10th Overall Circuit Cycliste Sarthe
1999
 National Road Championships
1st  Road race
2nd Time trial
 3rd Clásica a los Puertos
 5th Overall Tour de France
 5th Overall Vuelta a Asturias
 9th Overall Volta a Catalunya
1st Prologue
 9th Overall Euskal Bizikleta
2000
 2nd Overall Vuelta a España
Held  after Stages 10–12
 4th Overall Deutschland Tour
2001
 1st  Overall Vuelta a España
2002
 4th Memorial Manuel Galera
 6th Overall Vuelta a España

Grand Tour general classification results timeline

External links

1972 births
Living people
People from Camp de Morvedre
Sportspeople from the Province of Valencia
Cyclists from the Valencian Community
Spanish male cyclists
Vuelta a España winners
Spanish Vuelta a España stage winners